Anna Paulina Luna (née Mayerhofer; born May 6, 1989) is an American politician, swimsuit model, Instagram influencer, and conservative activist serving as the U.S. representative for Florida's 13th congressional district since 2023. She is the first Mexican-American woman elected to Congress from Florida.

Early life
Anna Paulina Mayerhofer was born in 1989 to George Mayerhofer, an architect, and Monica Todd, an elementary school teacher and stay-at-home mother, in Santa Ana, California. Her mother has Mexican-American ancestry and her father has Mexican and German ancestry, including a grandfather who was born in Germany and served in its military during World War II. Her maternal great-grandfather was an American immigrant to Mexico.

Luna's parents never married; her mother married another man when Luna was about eight years old. Luna was raised in the California cities of Santa Ana, Irvine, Aliso Viejo, and Los Angeles, and has called Santa Monica her hometown. She attended high school in Los Angeles.

Luna has a brother and sister.

Early career and education
Luna served as an airfield management specialist in the U.S. Air Force from 2009 to 2014, first at Whiteman Air Force Base in Missouri and then at Hurlburt Field in Florida. While enlisted, she appeared in 2013 in SI.com's Friday's P.M. Hot Clicks and briefly worked as a cocktail waitress at the Red Rose Gentlemen's Club, a strip club in Fort Walton Beach, Florida. She later appeared as a "Hometown Hottie" for Fort Walton Beach in Maxim in 2014. Luna gained a following as an Instagram influencer.

In 2017, Luna earned a Bachelor of Science degree in biology from the University of West Florida.

Luna became the Director of Hispanic Engagement for Turning Point USA in 2018. In a November 2018 Fox News segment, she compared Hillary Clinton to herpes, leading the network to cut the segment short and host Rick Leventhal and anchor Arthel Neville to apologize to viewers. In 2020, Luna was featured in the PragerU documentary-style series Americanos. Later that year, she appeared at a We Build the Wall event as vice president of Bienvenido, an organization dedicated to conservative Hispanic outreach. In March 2021, Luna became the chief correspondent for the conservative digital media platform El American English.

U.S. House of Representatives

Elections

2020 campaign

Luna decided to run for Congress in 2018. She entered the Republican primary for Florida's 13th congressional district in September 2019, and Matt Gaetz endorsed her in November 2019. She was also endorsed by Charlie Kirk, Elise Stefanik, Students for Trump, and former St. Petersburg, Florida mayor Bill Foster. In July 2020, she and her husband purchased a house in St. Petersburg, near MacDill Air Force Base, where her husband was stationed. Luna won the Republican primary, but lost to incumbent Charlie Crist in the general election.

2022 campaign
Luna was elected as the U.S. representative for Florida's 13th congressional district in the 2022 election, defeating Democratic nominee Eric Lynn, a former senior advisor for Barack Obama. Before the Republican primary, another Republican candidate privately threatened to have her assassinated by a hit squad. Donald Trump endorsed Luna, and Marjorie Taylor Greene campaigned for her in Florida.

Tenure
During the 2023 Speaker of the House election, Luna voted against Kevin McCarthy on the first 11 ballots, instead nominating Representative Jim Jordan and later Representative Byron Donalds.

Caucus memberships
 Freedom Caucus

Committee assignments
 Committee on Oversight and Accountability
 Committee on Natural Resources

Political positions

2020 presidential election
In June 2022, Luna said of the 2020 United States presidential election, "I believe that President Trump won that election, and I do believe that voter fraud occurred." The previous month, she attended a red carpet event and screening of 2000 Mules, a film that claims to show evidence of widespread electoral fraud in the 2020 election.

Abortion
Luna has said she favors abortion bans, and has called herself a "pro-life extremist". She has said her anti-abortion stance originates from having dissected a chicken egg in college and seeing the chick react to a scalpel blade: "God was using that opportunity to really wake me up."

Economy
In an August 2022 interview, Luna said that she would support a ban on U.S. oil exports in order to increase the domestic oil supply, saying, "The United States has literally one of the biggest supplies of cleanest oil in the entire world. There's no reason why we need to be going to places like Saudi Arabia or even Venezuela to get those oil sources." She said this view belonged to an "America First" platform, adding, "If it means not selling to other countries so that here in the United States, we can literally lower the gas prices, that's what I agree with."

Luna has said tourism is one of her highest priorities due to its importance in her district.

Education
Luna's website states that she opposes "radical left-wing gender theory being pushed on our kids".

Gun control
Luna appeared on the February/March 2020 cover of Ballistic magazine, which called her "DC's Next 2A Warrior". In February 2023, she was one of several members of Congress seen wearing AR-15 rifle lapel pins.

Twitter
In September 2020, Luna threatened to sue Twitter because the company refused to verify her account, alleging "political prejudice" and calling it "election meddling", and in October 2020, Luna's campaign said it filed a complaint with the FEC over Twitter's refusal to verify Luna's account. The FEC complaint said that Twitter violated the equal time rule by verifying Charlie Crist but not Luna and asked the FEC to force Twitter to verify Luna's account.

During a combative House of Representatives Oversight Committtee hearing on February 8, 2023, Luna alleged that Twitter, the federal government, "leftist nonprofits", and potentially the Democratic National Committee had acted jointly to censor Americans in November 2020 through the Jira project management platform, and that it violated the First Amendment.

Syria
In 2023, Luna was among 47 Republicans to vote in favor of H.Con.Res. 21, which directed President Joe Biden to remove U.S. troops from Syria within 180 days.

Disputed biographical claims

Jewish heritage
Luna has claimed she was raised as a Messianic Jew by her father and that she is "a small fraction Ashkenazi". But members of her extended family have said her father was Catholic, and that "they were not aware of him practicing any form of Judaism while Luna was growing up". Her mother has said that Luna's father was a "Christian that embraced the Messianic faith" after getting clean from drug addiction. Her grandfather, Heinrich Mayerhofer, identified as Catholic when he immigrated to Canada in 1954.

Relatives have said that during World War II, Heinrich Mayerhofer had served in the armed forces of Nazi Germany, known as the Wehrmacht. Luna's uncle, Edward Mayerhofer, has provided a photo of Heinrich wearing a military outfit, which the Simon Wiesenthal Center described as consistent with a Wehrmacht uniform. Luna responded to the allegations by saying that her maternal great-grandfathers, Antonio Luna and William Todd, served with the Allied Powers of World War II.

Mexican heritage
In 2020, Luna claimed in a PragerU documentary that her "entire mother's side of the family and father's side of the family on both sides are from Mexico". Her paternal grandfather, however, was German.

Difficult childhood
Luna has said that she "grew up in the welfare system" and was raised by her mother on government assistance with "no family to rely on". Her father was a drug addict, and she has said that at the age of 10 she found his bag of meth and was raised in a "broken home mentality". She has said that her grandmother died of AIDS due to heroin use. Luna has claimed that she and her mother lacked "a strong extended network of people" who could help care for them, and that she had attended "over six high schools" before graduating.

Luna's cousin has said, "The whole family kind of raised her—my dad was a part of her life when she was younger and we all kind of coddled her ... She was always a part of everything, all these family gatherings and activities". Luna's aunt said, "She had everything. What she needed and more ... And not only did [Luna's mother] provide for her, but [Luna's grandfather] did, too".

Luna has disputed these accounts, saying she "barely spent any time with them in her entire life". Luna's mother said she had to rely on welfare for periods of time, especially while she was putting herself through college at the University of California, Irvine and then at the UCLA School of Law, and that she was the only source of meaningful financial support for the family.

Air Force members who served with Luna in Missouri said she wore designer clothing and that she had mentioned having nannies as a child. Luna's mother said she owned a designer coat she bought at a thrift store and was known to wear it frequently, and that the idea of her having had nannies is "preposterous".

In August 2014, Luna wrote that she had set a goal to travel to 20 countries by her 25th birthday and that she was set to achieve it by December of that year.

Father's incarceration
Luna's campaign website biography says that throughout her childhood and teenage years, her father "spent time in and out of incarceration", and that she communicated with him "through letters to jail and collect calls". Luna's mother and aunt said that he served several short stints in jail for not paying child support. Luna's mother also said that he spent at least one year in jail for a drug-related charge.

A dismissed misdemeanor drug possession case indicated that Luna's father was in custody around the time of two court appearances, but the case information did not specify the length of his confinement, and court proceedings lasted only about three months.

Home break-in
In 2019, Luna said that she suffered "enduring trauma" after experiencing a "home invasion" by her landlord at 4 a.m. while stationed at Whiteman Air Force Base: "Had my friend Jeremy not been there to protect me, I'm pretty sure I wouldn’t be standing right here in front of you guys right now."

Luna's roommate said she did not remember such an incident. Instead, the roommate recalled a daytime break-in when Luna was not home. A Warrensburg Police Department report described the July 2010 incident as a "burglary not in progress". The report states that Luna and her roommate had reported to their landlord that the home's rear door had repeatedly been left open, so the landlord installed new locks, deadbolts and latches, but the problem persisted. Police records indicate that no suspect was arrested or charged in the case.

Use of stalking injunctions

Against her uncle during her 2020 campaign

During her first campaign for Congress, in 2020, Luna sought a stalking injunction request against her uncle, Edward Mayerhofer, after he questioned her biography on social media.

Against her 2022 primary opponent

In June 2021, Luna sought a stalking injunction against her primary opponent, William Braddock, after a friend of Luna's allegedly recorded Braddock threaten to make Luna "disappear" and claim that he had “access to a hit squad, too, Ukrainians and Russians". Braddock dropped out of the race after the judge granted a temporary injunction. The judge ultimately dismissed the request, saying she found one instance of harassment when the law required two.

Personal life
Luna is married to Andrew Gamberzky, a U.S. Air Force combat controller. After marriage, she changed her surname to Gamberzky. In 2019, she took her grandmother's maiden name, Luna, to represent her Hispanic heritage. She did this after her mother changed her name to Luna after a divorce. Luna identified herself as Hispanic in 2019.

Luna identifies as a Christian and has claimed to be a Messianic Jew. According to The Jerusalem Post, Luna is "almost certainly not Jewish" and lied about her heritage in a November 2022 interview with Jewish Insider.

In 2022, the family of a boy allegedly bitten by Luna's dog sued Luna, her campaign, and her husband.

Books
Luna has authored two books:
 Marrying the Beret: The Untold Stories of US Special Operations, Post Hill Press, 2018, 
 Bringing them Home: The Untold Cost of Putting Missions First, Post Hill Press, 2021,

See also
List of Hispanic and Latino Americans in the United States Congress
Americanos: Anna Paulina Luna, Mexico (PragerU, YouTube)
El American English (YouTube)

References

External links
Representative Anna Paulina Luna official U.S. House website
Campaign website

|-

1989 births
21st-century American politicians
21st-century American women politicians
American people of German descent
American politicians of Mexican descent
Candidates in the 2020 United States elections
Christians from Florida
Female members of the United States House of Representatives
Florida Republicans
Hispanic and Latino American members of the United States Congress
Hispanic and Latino American people in Florida politics
Hispanic and Latino American women in politics
Latino conservatism in the United States
Living people
People from Pinellas County, Florida
People from Santa Ana, California
People from Santa Monica, California
Republican Party members of the United States House of Representatives from Florida
Social media influencers
United States Air Force airmen
University of West Florida alumni